Paula Inês Alves de Sousa Real (born 6 June 1980) is a Portuguese jurist and politician who is currently president of the People Animals Nature parliamentary group in the Assembly of the Republic. At the PAN convention on 6 June 2021, she was elected on a single list as the spokesperson of the party.

Life before politics
With a degree in law and a master's degree in animal and society law, Sousa Real has been a jurist at the Municipality of Sintra since 2006 and she was head of the Tax Enforcement and Administrative Offenses Division from 2015 to October 2019. She was Lisbon's Municipal Animal Ombudsman from November 2014 to March 2017. For her dedication to the role, on a voluntary basis, she was awarded a commendation by the Lisbon Municipal Assembly

Political career
Sousa Real was elected to the Lisbon Municipal Assembly in 2017 and the Assembly of the Republic in 2019. She is a member of the political commission of the PAN. After André Lourenço e Silva announced he was stepping down, a party congress to elect a new leader was scheduled for the weekend of 5–6 June 2021. For that leadership congress, Sousa Real was the only candidate who stepped forward. On 6 June, she was elected as leader of PAN with 87.2% of the votes in the party's congress in Tomar.

In the snap elections in January 2022, Sousa Real was the only PAN deputy to be elected as the party fell from four seats to one. She said that the prospect of a Socialist Party absolute majority would be bad for democracy.

References

1980 births
Living people
Women members of the Assembly of the Republic (Portugal)
Members of the Assembly of the Republic (Portugal)
People Animals Nature politicians
21st-century Portuguese women politicians
21st-century Portuguese politicians